Almin Kulenović (born 15 November 1973) is a Bosnian retired football player. He works as a youth coach for Croatian lower league side Špansko.

Club career
He debuted in Croatia's top tier for Slaven Belupo in the 1998/99 season. He made his debut for Maksimir in September 2005 against Tekstilac Ravnice.

International career
Kulenović made 7 appearances for Bosnia and Herzegovina, the first five of them at the June 2001 Merdeka Tournament: an unofficial match against Slovakia there marked his international debut. His final international was an August 2001 LG Cup match against South Africa.

Personal life
His son, Sandro, plays for Dinamo Zagreb and the Croatia national under-21 football team.

References

External links

Profile - NFSBIH

1973 births
Living people
People from Bihać
Croats of Bosnia and Herzegovina
Association football defenders
Bosnia and Herzegovina footballers
Bosnia and Herzegovina international footballers
NK Slaven Belupo players
NK Jedinstvo Bihać players
HNK Šibenik players
NK Croatia Sesvete players
NK Međimurje players
First Football League (Croatia) players
Second Football League (Croatia) players
Croatian Football League players
Premier League of Bosnia and Herzegovina players
Bosnia and Herzegovina expatriate footballers
Expatriate footballers in Croatia
Bosnia and Herzegovina expatriate sportspeople in Croatia